A bomber is a military aircraft that delivers bombs or other explosives.

Bomber or Bombers may also refer to:

Books, films and games
 Bomber (novel), a 1970 historical fiction novel by Len Deighton
 Bomber (1941 film), a short documentary
 Bomber (1982 film), a comedy
 Bomber (2009 film), by Paul Cotter
 Bomber (video game), for the Macintosh computer

Music
 The Bombers (band) a short lived Australian dance duo
 Bomber (album), a 1979 album by Motörhead
"Bomber" (song), the album's title song
 "Bombers" (David Bowie song), 1971
 "Bombers" (Tubeway Army song), 1978
 "Bombers", a 1943 Soviet adaptation by Leonid Utyosov of the song "Comin' In on a Wing and a Prayer" by The Song Spinners

Sports teams
 Battle Creek Bombers, an American minor league baseball team
 Bronx Bombers, nickname for the New York Yankees baseball team
 Brooks Bombers, baseball team in the Western Canadian Baseball League
 Brisbane Bombers, a proposed Australian professional rugby league NRL expansion franchise
 Chicago Brown Bombers, a former American baseball team in the Negro Major League and the United States League
 Essendon Football Club in the Australian Football League, also known as the Essendon Bombers
 Ithaca Bombers, an American collegiate football team
 JRU Heavy Bombers, the varsity team of Jose Rizal University of Manila
 Kapunda Football Club in South Australia's Barossa, Light and Gawler Football Association, also known as the Kapunda Bombers
 St. Louis Bombers Rugby Football Club
 St. Xavier Bombers, the sports teams of St. Xavier High School in Cincinnati, Ohio
 Windham Bombers, the sports teams of Windham High School in Ohio
 Winnipeg Blue Bombers, a Canadian Football League team

Other uses
 Bomber (nickname), a list of people
 Bomber (computer virus)
 a beer bottle that holds

See also
 Flight jacket, a jacket also known as a bomber jacket